The 1966 Georgia Tech Yellow Jackets football team represented the Georgia Institute of Technology during the 1966 NCAA University Division football season. The Yellow Jackets were led by head coach Bobby Dodd, in his 22nd and final year with the team, and played their home games at Grant Field in Atlanta. 

An independent, Georgia Tech opened with nine wins, then lost at rival Georgia. They finished the regular season at 9–1 and were ranked eighth in both final polls. The Yellow Jackets were invited to the Orange Bowl, but lost to the Florida Gators.

Schedule

References

External links
 Georgia Tech Yellow Jackets football – 1966 season – Statistics, roster 

Georgia Tech
Georgia Tech Yellow Jackets football seasons
Georgia Tech Yellow Jackets football